HD 40307 e is an extrasolar planet candidate suspected to be orbiting the star HD 40307. It is located 42 light-years away in the direction of the southern constellation Pictor. The planet was discovered by the radial velocity method, using the European Southern Observatory's HARPS apparatus  by a team of astronomers led by Mikko Tuomi at the University of Hertfordshire and Guillem Anglada-Escude of the University of Göttingen, Germany.

The existence of the planet was disputed in 2015, as more Doppler spectroscopy data has become available.

Planetary characteristics
Its minimum mass is 3.5 that of Earth - the smallest - and dynamical models suggest it cannot be much more (and so is measured close to edge-on). It further gets roughly the same insolation from its star as Mercury gets from the Sun. Planets like this in that system have been presumed "super-Earth".

However planets b, c, and d are presumed to have migrated in from outer orbits; and planet b is predicted a sub-Neptune. It is likely that this planet formed even further out. Whether it is a sub-Neptune, a super-Venus or even a super-Mercury is unknown.

References

External links
 

HD 40307
Pictor (constellation)
Exoplanet candidates